Jonathan Mandle is a Professor of Philosophy and former Philosophy Department Chair at the University at Albany, The State University of New York. He is a member of the Crooked Timber group blog.  He is the brother of NBA player Adonal Foyle.

Education
B.A., University of Pennsylvania, Philosophy
Ph.D., University of Pittsburgh, Philosophy, under the direction of Kurt Baier

Interests
Ethics and political theory and their history
John Rawls' theory of social justice

Publications
What's Left of Liberalism? An Interpretation and Defense of Justice as Fairness. Lexington Books, 2000.
Global Justice: An Introduction. Blackwell Publishers, 2006.

Notable blog posts
Lifeboat Ethics (critique of Garrett Hardin)
All posts (Crooked Timber post list for Jon Mandle)

External links
Faculty page
Photograph

University of Pennsylvania alumni
University of Pittsburgh alumni
20th-century American philosophers
21st-century American philosophers
American philosophy academics
Living people
University at Albany, SUNY faculty
Year of birth missing (living people)